Sasquatch Books is an American book publishing company based in Seattle, Washington. It was founded in 1986 by David Brewster of the Seattle Weekly and primarily publishes nonfiction books about the western United States and Canada and cover topics such as nature, travel, gardening, entertainment, sports, food and wine. By 2003, it was publishing approximately 30 books per year and employed 18 people. In 2020, it launched a new imprint for young adult nonfiction called Spruce Books.

Sasquatch Books was acquired by Penguin Random House in 2017.

Titles

Book Lust by Nancy Pearl (2003)
Gardener's Yoga: 40 Yoga Poses to Help Your Garden Flow by Veronica D'Orazio (2015)
Full-Rip 9.0: The Next Big Earthquake in the Pacific Northwest by Sandi Doughton
Women in Tech: Take Your Career to the Next Level with Practical Advice and Inspiring Stories by Tarah Wheeler (2016)

See also 
 List of publishers

References

External links 
 

Book publishing companies based in Seattle
Publishing companies established in 1986
1986 establishments in Washington (state)
American companies established in 1986